Bursellia is a genus of African dwarf spiders that was first described by Å. Holm in 1962.

Species
 it contains eight species and one subspecies:
Bursellia cameroonensis Bosmans & Jocqué, 1983 – Cameroon
Bursellia comata Holm, 1962 – Congo, Uganda
Bursellia c. kivuensis Holm, 1964 – Congo
Bursellia gibbicervix (Denis, 1962) – Tanzania
Bursellia glabra Holm, 1962 (type) – Congo, Kenya
Bursellia holmi Bosmans, 1977 – Kenya
Bursellia paghi Jocqué & Scharff, 1986 – Tanzania
Bursellia setifera (Denis, 1962) – Cameroon, Congo, Kenya, Tanzania, Malawi
Bursellia unicornis Bosmans, 1988 – Cameroon

See also
 List of Linyphiidae species

References

Araneomorphae genera
Linyphiidae
Spiders of Africa